The sixth and final season of the American television musical drama series Nashville, created by Callie Khouri, premiered on January 4, 2018, on CMT. The season consisted of 16 episodes.

As with seasons three through five, the episodes are named after songs from a variety of country artists, including Taylor Swift ("Jump Then Fall"), Miranda Lambert ("New Strings"), George Jones ("Sometimes You Just Can't Win"), Tanya Tucker ("Two Sparrows in a Hurricane"), and Hank Williams ("Beyond the Sunset").

Production
In April 2017, it was announced that the series had been renewed for a sixth season, with a 16-episode order.  In an interview following the fifth season finale, Marshall Herskovitz confirmed that actor Jeffrey Nordling would return as Jessie Caine's ex-husband Brad and that the new season would see the introduction of two new characters. Filming began on September 27, 2017. Five new major recurring cast members were announced in November 2017. On November 17, 2017, it was confirmed that it would be the series's final season. 

The sixth season premiere was available on Hulu in the evening hours of December 19, 2017, and removed 24 hours later. Episodes aired an hour and two hours later on the Paramount Network and TV Land, following the initial airing on CMT. TVLand discontinued reruns of the series after episode five, but returned for the second half of the season.

The season, like season five, was aired in two parts with the final eight episodes airing in the summer. The final eight episodes returned on June 7 and the season wrapped on July 26, 2018.

The season wrap party was held on April 7, 2018. Filming wrapped on the finale three days later.

The series received $5.7million in tax incentives from the state of Tennessee, the lowest of all seasons.

Cast

Main
 Hayden Panettiere as Juliette Barnes
 Clare Bowen as Scarlett O'Connor
 Chris Carmack as Will Lexington
 Charles Esten as Deacon Claybourne
 Jonathan Jackson as Avery Barkley
 Sam Palladio as Gunnar Scott
 Lennon Stella as Maddie Conrad
 Maisy Stella as Daphne Conrad
 Kaitlin Doubleday as Jessie Caine
 Jeffrey Nordling as Brad Maitland

Recurring
 Ed Amatrudo as Glenn Goodman
 Kourtney Hansen as Emily
 Andi Rayne and Nora Gill as Cadence Barkley
 Melvin Kearney as Bo
 David Alford as Bucky Dawes
 Josh Stamberg as Darius Enright
 Jake Etheridge as Sean McPherson
 Rainee Blake as Alannah Curtis
 Nic Luken as Jonah Ford
 Dylan Arnold as Twig Wysecki
 Ilse DeLange as Ilse de Witt
 Mia Maestro as Rosa
 Ronny Cox as Gideon Claybourne
 Cameron Scoggins as Zach Welles

Guest
 Rhiannon Giddens as Hallie Jordan
 Connie Britton as Rayna Jaymes
 Sylvia Jeffries as Jolene Barnes
 Eric Close as Teddy Conrad
 Will Chase as Luke Wheeler
 Judith Hoag as Tandy Hampton
 Kyle Dean Massey as Kevin Bicks
 Dana Wheeler-Nicholson as Beverly O'Connor
 Mark Collie as Frankie Gray
 Alicia Witt as Autumn Chase
 Joseph David-Jones as himself 
 Callie Khouri as herself
 Marshall Herskovitz as himself
 Edward Zwick as himself
 Nick Jandl as himself
 Keean Johnson as himself
 Derek Krantz as himself
 Elaina Smith as herself
 Pam Tillis as herself
 Nancy O'Dell as herself
 Steve Earle as himself

Notes

Episodes

Ratings

Nielsen

TVLand

References

External links
 
 

Season 6
2018 American television seasons
Split television seasons